Jinrikisha may refer to:

 A rickshaw, a two or three-wheeled passenger cart
See also: pulled rickshaw, rickshaw (disambiguation)
 Production Jinrikisha, Japanese talent agency